Jaime Jonathan Barría Soto (born July 18, 1996) is a Panamanian professional baseball pitcher for the Los Angeles Angels of Major League Baseball (MLB). 
Barría signed with the Angels as an international free agent in 2013. He made his MLB debut in 2018.

Career

Minor leagues
Barría signed with the Los Angeles Angels for $60,000 as an international free agent in 2013. He made his debut that same year with the Dominican Summer Angels of the Rookie-level Dominican Summer League, pitching in five innings and giving up six earned runs. He returned there in 2014 where he improved, going 4–4 with a 3.03 earned run average (ERA) in 16 games (eight starts). In 2015 he played for both the Arizona Angels of the Rookie-level Arizona League and the Orem Owlz of the Advanced Rookie-level Pioneer League, pitching to a combined 5–4 record and 4.02 ERA in 15 games (14 starts). He pitched in 2016 for the Burlington Bees of the Class A Midwest League and was named the Angels' Pitching Prospect of the Year by MLBPipeline.com after he compiled an 8–6 record and 3.85 ERA with a 1.32 WHIP in 25 starts.

Barría began the 2017 season with the Inland Empire 66ers of the Class A-Advanced California League. The Angels promoted him to the Mobile BayBears of the Class AA Southern League on June 4, and to the Salt Lake Bees of the Class AAA Pacific Coast League for his final three starts of the year. In 26 starts between the three clubs, he went 7–9 with a 2.80 ERA. He was selected to appear in the All-Star Futures Game. The Angels added Barría to their 40-man roster after the season.

Barría began the 2018 season with Salt Lake.

Major leagues
After he made one start for the Bees in 2018, the Angels promoted Barría to the major leagues on April 11, 2018, to make his debut against the Texas Rangers.

On April 22, 2018, Barria faced Brandon Belt of the San Francisco Giants who had an at bat that lasted 21 pitches before ending with a fly out to right field, breaking the MLB record for most pitches to a single batter in a single at bat. On the season, Barría started 26 games for the Angels, going 10–9 with a 3.53 ERA with 98 strikeouts in  innings. He was the fifth-youngest player in the AL. In 2020, he went 1–0 in 7 games (5 starts).

On January 13, 2023, Barría signed a one-year, $1.05 million contract with the Angels, avoiding salary arbitration.

References

External links

1996 births
Arizona League Angels players
Burlington Bees players
Dominican Summer Angels players
Inland Empire 66ers of San Bernardino players
Living people
Los Angeles Angels players
Major League Baseball pitchers
Major League Baseball players from Panama
Mobile BayBears players
Orem Owlz players
Panamanian expatriate baseball players in the United States
Salt Lake Bees players
Sportspeople from Panama City
Tigres del Licey players
Panamanian expatriate baseball players in the Dominican Republic
2023 World Baseball Classic players